Ricardo Samuel Cruz Moura (born 14 December 1988) is a Portuguese professional footballer who plays for Leixões S.C. as a goalkeeper.

Club career

Aves
Born in Valongo, Porto District, Moura spent his early career in amateur football. In the summer of 2012, he moved straight to the Segunda Liga with C.D. Aves but failed to make an appearance in the league during his two-year spell, playing six matches in all competitions including a 6–0 away loss against S.L. Benfica in the fifth round of the Taça de Portugal.

Leixões
Moura signed with Leixões S.C. – he had already represented them at youth level, scoring from his goal in a 2–2 draw with Vitória de Guimarães– for the 2014–15 season. His professional league debut took place on 1 March 2015, in a 2–0 away win over C.D. Trofense.

Moura only missed one league game in 46 in the 2015–16 campaign, helping his team finish in 18th place and thus avoid relegation from the second division.

Tondela
On 6 August 2017, Moura agreed to a two-year contract at C.D. Tondela.

References

External links

1988 births
Living people
People from Valongo
Sportspeople from Porto District
Portuguese footballers
Association football goalkeepers
Liga Portugal 2 players
Leixões S.C. players
Padroense F.C. players
C.D. Aves players
C.D. Tondela players
Associação Académica de Coimbra – O.A.F. players
G.D. Chaves players